Heterocrossa cryodana is a species of moth in the family Carposinidae. It is endemic to New Zealand.

Taxonomy
This species was described by Edward Meyrick in 1885 using material collected in Dunedin and named Heterocrossa cryodana. In 1922 Meyrick listed Heterocrossa as a synonym for Carposina. George Hudson, in his 1928 publication The Butterflies and Moths of New Zealand, discusses this species under the name Carposina cryodana. Alfred Philpott studied the male genitalia of this species in 1928. In 1978 Elwood Zimmerman argued that the genus Heterocrassa should not be a synonym of Carposina as the genitalia of the species within the genus Heterocrassa are distinctive. In 1988 John S. Dugdale assigned the species back to the genus Heterocrossa. The lectotype specimen is held at the Natural History Museum, London.

Description

This species was described by Meyrick as follows:

Distribution
This species is endemic to New Zealand. It has been collected in Dunedin and Invercargill and Codfish Island.

Biology and behaviour

This species is on the wing in September and November. It is associated with Leptospermum species. Larvae of the species have been found on fruits.

References

External links

Image of lectotype specimen

Carposinidae
Moths of New Zealand
Moths described in 1885
Endemic fauna of New Zealand
Taxa named by Edward Meyrick
Endemic moths of New Zealand